Odyssey: The Remix Collection is a 2001 compilation of remixes from Delerium's past single releases.

Track listing

Disc one 
 "Silence" (DJ Tiesto's In Search of Sunrise Remix) – 11:32
 "Underwater" (Above & Beyond's 21st Century Mix) – 7:39
 "Heaven's Earth" (Key South Remix) – 7:45
 "Innocente" (Deep Dish Gladiator Remix UK Edit) – 9:54
 "Euphoria (Firefly)" (Rabbit in the Moon's Divine Gothic Disco Mix) – 7:45
 "Duende" (Bleak Desolation Mix) – 4:33
 "Flowers Become Screens" (Return Mix) – 5:05

Disc two
 "Heaven's Earth" (Matt Darey Remix) – 8:58
 "Silence" (Fade's Sanctuary Mix) – 9:33
 "Duende" (Spiritual Collapse Mix) – 7:54
 "Incantation" (12 Inch Mix Edit) – 7:31
 "Underwater" (MaUVe's Dark Vocal Mix) – 7:48
 "Innocente" (Mr. Sam's The Space Between Us Mix) – 9:52
 "Silence" (Michael Woods Mix) – 7:08
 "Flowers Become Screens" (Frequency Modulation Mix) – 7:41

References

Delerium albums
2001 remix albums
Nettwerk Records remix albums